Tamarin can have various meanings: 
Tamarins are any of the small squirrel-like monkeys of South America in the genus Saguinus of the family Cebidae.
Lion tamarins are closely related to the tamarins, and are in genus Leontopithecus.
Tamarin (software) is a free ActionScript and ECMAScript virtual machine and JIT compiler.
Tamarin Prover (software) is a computer software program for formal verification of cryptographic protocols.
Tamarin, Mauritius is a village on the island country of Mauritius.
Tamarin, Suriname is a village in Suriname.

See also
Tamaran
Tamarind